Sibour is a surname. Notable people with the surname include:

Jules Henri de Sibour (1872–1938), French architect
Marie-Dominique-Auguste Sibour (1792–1857), Catholic Archbishop of Paris, assassinated by a priest

See also
SIBOR
Sibur